Mordellistena parabrevicauda is a species of beetle in the genus Mordellistena of the family Mordellidae. It was described by 1965 in Ermisch.

References

Beetles described in 1965
parabrevicauda